Sion Hill FC is a Vincentian association football club based in Sion Hill neighborhood of Arnos Vale. The club finished second in 2016.

Squad

References

External links 
 Official Website
 Facebook page

Sion Hill
Sion Hill
Association football clubs established in 1975